Gavril Maghiar (born 10 December 1926 – 2005) was a Romanian former sports shooter. He competed at the 1960 Summer Olympics and the 1964 Summer Olympics. He finished in 6th place in the rapid fire pistol event at the 1960 Olympics, and in 3rd place at the European Championships. He was one of the 6 emeritus coaches of Dinamo Sports Club in Bucharest, for sports shooting

References

External links
 

1926 births
2005 deaths
Romanian male sport shooters
Olympic shooters of Romania
Shooters at the 1960 Summer Olympics
Shooters at the 1964 Summer Olympics
People from Bihor County